Stewart Henderson (born 13 January 1982) is a Scottish former professional association footballer, who played as a midfielder for Forfar Athletic and Brechin City.

References 

1982 births
Association football midfielders
Forfar Athletic F.C. players
Brechin City F.C. players
Scottish footballers
Scottish Football League players
Living people